Use Your Weapons is the third studio album by the American power pop band Valley Lodge. The album was released on September 3, 2013 by the record label Explosive Industries. It was re-released in Japan in 2014 with bonus tracks.

Track listings

Notes 

The song 'Go' features as the  theme music on the HBO show Last Week Tonight with John Oliver.

References

Valley Lodge (band) albums
2013 albums